William Hartnett may refer to:
 William J. Hartnett (1932–2016), member of the Ohio House of Representatives
 William E. Hartnett (1919–2002), member of the Illinois House of Representatives
 Will Ford Hartnett (born 1956), member of the Texas House of Representatives